Troxel v. Granville, 530 U.S. 57 (2000), is a case in which the Supreme Court of the United States, citing a constitutional right of parents to direct the upbringing of their children, struck down a Washington State law that allowed any third party to petition state courts for child visitation rights over parental objections.

Background
Tommie Granville and Brad Troxel had two daughters from a relationship that ended in 1991. After their separation, Brad Troxel lived with his parents and regularly brought his daughters to his parents' home for weekend visitations. Brad Troxel died in May 1993, and in October 1993 Tommie Granville informed Brad Troxel's parents that she wished to limit visitations to once a month. The paternal grandparents petitioned to obtain visitation rights with their granddaughters. The Washington Superior Court ordered that the grandparents have visitation one weekend per month, one week during the summer, and four hours on both of the petitioning grandparents' birthdays. Granville appealed. Before addressing the merits of the case, the State Court of Appeals remanded for entry of written findings of fact and conclusions of law, citing the best interests of the children as reason for their decision. The Washington Court of Appeals reversed the lower court's decision, dismissed the Troxels' petition, and held that the limitations on non-parental visitation were consistent with "parents' fundamental liberty interest in the care, custody, and management of their children". The Washington State Supreme Court affirmed, and the U.S. Supreme court granted certiorari.

Plurality 
The Court held that "the interest of parents in the care, custody and control of their children—is perhaps the oldest of the fundamental liberty interests recognized by this Court." That fundamental right is implicated in grandparent visitation cases, and as such, it struck down the Washington visitation statute because it unconstitutionally infringed on the right.

State courts considering non-parent visitation petitions must apply "a presumption that fit parents act in the best interests of their children." Troxel requires that state courts must give "special weight" to a fit parent's decision to deny non-parent visitation, as well as other decisions made by a parent regarding the care and custody of their children.

The plurality held that "choices [parents make] about the upbringing of children... are among associational rights... sheltered by the Fourteenth Amendment against the State's unwarranted usurpation, disregard, or disrespect." This principle must inform the understanding of the "special weight" that Troxel requires courts to give to parents' decisions. Even though Troxel does not define "special weight," previous Supreme Court precedent indicates that "special weight" is a term signifying very considerable deference.

The "special weight" requirement, as illuminated by these prior Supreme Court cases, means that the deference provided to the parent's wishes will be overcome only by some compelling governmental interest and by overwhelmingly clear factual circumstances supporting that governmental interest. This is essentially identical to the strict scrutiny standard, in keeping with the fundamental status of parental rights.

Concurrences
Justice Souter questioned the Washington Supreme Court's holding, and the plurality's strong implication, that actual harm must be demonstrated before a parental decision may be questioned by a state authority, and instead argued that the statute was unconstitutional on its face due to overbreadth.

Justice Thomas applied strict scrutiny and reached the conclusion that "the State of Washington lacks even a legitimate governmental interest–to say nothing of a compelling one–in second-guessing a fit parent’s decision regarding visitation with third parties." However, Thomas questioned whether Meyer v. Nebraska and Pierce v. Society of Sisters were correctly decided, but floated the possibility that parental rights may be protected under the Privileges or Immunities Clause of the Fourteenth Amendment instead. Because neither party asked the Court to do so, Thomas did not reexamine the holdings of Meyer and Pierce.

Dissent 
Justice Scalia  wrote that while the right of parents to direct the upbringing of their children is among the "unalienable Rights" with which the Declaration of Independence proclaims "all men ... are endowed by their Creator," and that right is also among the unenumerated "othe[r] [rights] retained by the people" under the Ninth Amendment, parents have no enforceable rights because they are not specifically enumerated in the Constitution.

Justice Stevens' opinion stated that parents have some rights under the Constitution, but that states may infringe upon them to guarantee the child's interest in a relationship with third parties. Stevens stated that parental rights may not be exercised in a way that a state court may deem to be "arbitrary", and that the best interest of the child standard was sufficient.

Justice Kennedy likewise argued that the best interest of the child standard may be applied, but the parent's decision should be given some weight, and stated that the judgment should be vacated and remanded to the Washington courts to determine whether the factual circumstances justified overturning Granville's decision. Kennedy also raised the concern that state family court procedures may be disrupted by the Court's holding.

Legacy
The decision in Troxel v. Granville affected the interpretation of state laws granting grandparent visitation rights. The Troxel Court declined to decide whether the Due Process Clause requires nonparental visitation statutes to include a showing of harm in order to be valid, leaving the question open as to what governmental interests courts should consider in deciding if visitation is appropriate. Many states have upheld nonparental visitation statutes against Troxel challenges by distinguishing between statutes applying the "best interests" standard that gave equal weight to parental and nonparental claims and statutes that give extra weight to parental parties.

See also
 List of United States Supreme Court cases, volume 530
 List of United States Supreme Court cases
 Lists of United States Supreme Court cases by volume
 Meyer v. Nebraska
 Pierce v. Society of Sisters
 Parham v. J.R.
 Family law
 Parental rights

References

External links
 
 
Edward Walsh, "Court Limits Visitation Rights of Grandparents; State Can't Overrule Decision Of a Fit Parent, Justices Say," Washington Post, June 6, 2000.
Joan Catherine Bohl, "That 'Thorny Issue' Redux: California Grandparent Visitation Law in the Wake of Troxel v. Granville" 36 Golden Gate U.L.Rev (2006)

United States Supreme Court cases
United States Supreme Court cases of the Rehnquist Court
United States substantive due process case law
2000 in United States case law
Family law in the United States
Legal history of Washington (state)
Trials regarding custody of children